Potter House may refer to:

in the United States
(by state then city)
Potter Section House, Anchorage, Alaska, listed on the National Register of Historic Places (NRHP)
Dell Ranch House, Clifton, Arizona, listed on the NRHP in Arizona
 Potter House (St. Petersburg, Florida), listed on the NRHP
 Potter House (Rock Island, Illinois), listed on the NRHP
William Potter House, Lafayette, Indiana, listed on the NRHP
Potter-Williams House (Davenport, Iowa), NRHP-listed
Potter Hall, Williston, Maryland, listed on the NRHP
Potter Estate, Newton, Massachusetts, listed on the NRHP
Potter-O'Brian House, Waltham, Massachusetts, listed on the NRHP
Potter-Van Camp House, Bath, New York, listed on the NRHP
Ephraim B. Potter House, Glens Falls, New York, listed on the NRHP
Potter-Williams House (Huntington, New York), listed on the NRHP
Arnold Potter House, Potter, New York, listed on the NRHP
Judge Joseph Potter House, Whitehall, New York, listed on the NRHP
Wallace and Glenn Potter House, Eugene, Oregon, listed on the NRHP
Miles B. and Eleanor Potter House, Hood River, Oregon, listed on the NRHP in Oregon
Potter-Allison Farm, Centre Hall, Pennsylvania, listed on the NRHP
Potter-Remington House, Cranston, Rhode Island, listed on the NRHP
Potter-Collyer House, Pawtucket, Rhode Island, listed on the NRHP
The Potter's House Church, Dallas, Texas
H. W. Potter House, Yakima, Washington, listed on the NRHP

See also
Potter-Williams House (disambiguation)